Otter fishing is a fishing technique which uses trained otters to fish in rivers. This method has been practised since the 6th century in various parts of the world, and is still practiced in southern Bangladesh.

History

Otter fishing has been practiced historically in a number of regions including Central Europe, Northern Africa, the British Isles, Scandinavia, South Asia, Southeast Asia, China and South America.

The earliest records of otter fishing are from the Yangtze region of China during the Tang dynasty (618–907) and was observed in the 13th century by Marco Polo on the Yangtze River. Otter fishing in China was practiced for subsistence and also collectively for profit. The Chinese reputedly learned the techniques from the fishermen of Southeast Asia. In India, otter fishing was practiced in the Indus and Ganges river basins, in Bengal and in South India along the Coromandel Coast.

Otter fishing was known in Europe from as early as the 16th century. The Scandinavians trained otters for catching trout. Olaus Magnus, the Archbishop of Uppsala, published a tome in 1555, De Gentibus Septentrionalibus (On Northern Peoples), which includes a sketch of a fishing otter. One of the motifs of Magnus's 1539 map of Scandinavia, Carta marina, is an otter fetching a fish for its master, who is ready with a knife and a cooking vessel on the fire.

Fishing with otters was known in England, Scotland, Germany and Poland. The first mention of otter fishing in the British Isles dates to 1480, while the method for training otters is described in the 1653 book on angling by Izaak Walton, The Compleat Angler. Individual sportsmen in the Americas and Europe have also used otters for sport fishing. British sportsmen who had served in South India during the early years of the Raj have been known to import this practice to their homes in Europe.

Otter fishing is also reported from Central and South America. A Maxacali creation story from Brazil suggests that the practice of otter fishing may have been prevalent in the past. Fishermen from Guyana used a different tactic – they would observe where an otter deposited its catch and later purloin the fish.

Method
In the Old World, two otter species have been primarily used in otter fishing – the European otter (Lutra lutra), chiefly in Europe and North Africa, and the smooth-coated otter (Lutrogale perspicillata), mostly in South Asia and China. And in the New World, only the giant otter (Pteronura brasiliensis) has been used, usually in South America.

Olaus Magnus wrote that the otter often fetches the catch for its master but "once in awhile forgets and eats the fish". Izaak Walton's 1653 book describes otter pups, three to four months old, being domesticated and trained. The otters were muzzled to prevent them eating fish and secured by lines to their master. The otters then chased fish in a pond into a net. Another technique was to submerge nets and get the otters to shepherd the fish into them, after which the nets, along with otters and catch, were retrieved.

In ancient China, the otter wore a leather harness on its body to which an iron chain was attached. The other end of the chain was either secured to the fisherman's boat or to a bamboo pole. The fisherman would cast his circular net, weighted at the edges, and pull it in. As the net was being pulled in, the otter would be introduced into the net through a small opening. The otter's role was to search for and disturb fish hiding in nooks and crannies and force them into the net so that they were trapped. The otter was subsequently rewarded in the case of a good catch. The practice of using otters to drive fish into nets was prevalent in Asia and is still practiced in southern Bangladesh.

Bangladesh

Otter fishing is still practiced in Narail and Khulna districts, near the Sunderbans in southern Bangladesh. Here fishing with otters is a traditional practice in families, passed down through the generations by fishermen who breed the otters and train them to chase the fish into their nets. Earlier, both Lutra lutra and Lutrogale perspicillata were used for otter fishing, but today, only L. perspicillata is used. Otter fishing is usually done at night between 9 PM and 5 AM. Feeroz et al. (2011) recorded a population of 176 domesticated otters held in captivity amongst 46 groups of fishermen in these districts, of which 138 were working animals. Lack of fish, changes sought in livelihoods by the young and more economical methods of fishing have reduced the number of otter fishermen drastically.

See also

Cormorant fishing

References

Further reading

External links
 Video: Journeyman Pictures & ABC Australia. Traditional Otter Fishing in Bangladesh (1997)
 Video: BBC (9 April 2012). Threat to otter fishing in Bangladesh
 Video: Time.com (27 Mar 2014). Otters Have Helped Bangladesh Fishermen Catch Fish For Centuries
 Slideshow: CBS News (11 March 2014). Otters aid Bangladesh fishermen

Fishing in Bangladesh
Fishing techniques and methods
Otters
Working animals